William Abrahams Books was an imprint at:
Holt, Rinehart & Winston (1977-1984)
E. P. Dutton (1984-1998)